Zamsé may refer to:
Zamsé, Bam, Burkina Faso
Zamsé, Ganzourgou, Burkina Faso